The Indian elephant (Elephas maximus indicus) is one of four extant recognised subspecies of the Asian elephant and native to mainland Asia.

Since 1986, the Asian elephant has been listed as Endangered on the IUCN Red List as the wild population has declined by at least 50% since the 1930s to 1940s, i.e. three elephant generations. The Asian elephant is threatened by habitat loss, degradation and fragmentation.

Characteristics 

In general, Asian elephants are smaller than African elephants and have the highest body point on the head. The tip of their trunk has one finger-like process. Their back is convex or level. Their skin colour is lighter than that of E. m. maximus with smaller patches of depigmentation, but darker than that of E. m. sumatranus. Females are usually smaller than males, and have short or no tusks.

In 1985, two large elephant bulls were spotted for the first time in Bardia National Park, and named Raja Gaj and Kanchha. They roamed the park area together and occasionally visited female herds. His forehead and domes were more prominent than in other Asian bull elephants. His appearance has been compared to that of a Stegodon and mammoth due to his high bi-domed shaped head.

Indian elephants have smaller ears, but relatively broader skulls and larger trunks than African elephants. Toes are large and broad. Unlike their African cousins, their abdomen is proportionate with their body weight but the African elephant has a large abdomen as compared to the skulls.

Distribution and habitat

The Indian elephant is native to mainland Asia: India, Nepal, Bangladesh, Bhutan, Myanmar, Thailand, Malay Peninsula, Laos, China, Cambodia, and Vietnam. It is regionally extinct in Pakistan. It inhabits grasslands, dry deciduous, moist deciduous, evergreen and semi-evergreen forests. In the early 1990s, the estimated wild populations included:
 27,785–31,368 in India, where populations are restricted to four general areas:
 in the Northwest – at the foot of the Himalayas in Uttarakhand and Uttar Pradesh, ranging from Katarniaghat Wildlife Sanctuary to the Yamuna River;
 in the Northeast – from the eastern border of Nepal in northern West Bengal through western Assam along the Himalaya foothills as far as the Mishmi Hills, extending into eastern Arunachal Pradesh, the plains of upper Assam, and the foothills of Nagaland, to the Garo Hills of Meghalaya through the Khasi Hills, to parts of the lower Brahmaputra plains and Karbi Plateau; isolated herds occur in Tripura, Mizoram, Manipur, and in the Barak Valley districts of Assam:
 in the central part – in Odisha, Jharkhand, and in the southern part of West Bengal, with some animals wandering into Chhattisgarh;
 in the South – eight populations are fragmented from each other in northern Karnataka, in the crestline of Karnataka–Western Ghats, in Bhadra–Malnad, in Brahmagiri–Nilgiris–Eastern Ghats, in Nilambur–Silent Valley–Coimbatore, in Anamalai–Parambikulam, in Periyar–Srivilliputhur, and one in Agasthyamalai;
 100–125 in Nepal, where their range is restricted to a few protected areas in the Terai along the border with India. In 2002, estimates ranged from 106 to 172 resident and migratory elephants, with most of them in Bardia National Park;
 150–250 in Bangladesh, where only isolated populations survive in the Chittagong Hills;
 250–500 in Bhutan, where their range is limited to protected areas in the south along the border with India;
 4,000–5,000 in Myanmar, where populations are highly fragmented, and occur in the northern ranges and Arakan Yoma in western, Pegu Yoma of central Myanmar, Tenasserim and Shan State;

 2,500–3,200 in Thailand, mainly in the mountains along the border with Myanmar, with smaller fragmented populations occurring in the peninsula in the south;
 2,100–3,100 in Malaysia;
 500–1,000 Laos, where they remain widely but patchily distributed in forested areas, both in the highlands and lowlands;
 200–250 in China, where they survive only in the prefectures of Xishuangbanna, Simao, and Lincang of southern Yunnan;
 250–600 in Cambodia, where they primarily inhabit the mountains of the south-west and in Mondulkiri and Ratanakiri Provinces;
 70–150 in the southern parts of Vietnam.

Elephant corridors 
There are a total of 138 state elephant corridors, 28 interstate corridors and 17 international state corridors where Indian elephant populations are found. The table below enlists the corridors.

Ecology and behaviour 

They are generalist feeders, and both grazers and browsers. They graze on the tall grasses, but the portion consumed varies with season. When the new flush appears in April, they remove the tender blades in small clumps. When grasses are mature in autumn, they clean and consume the succulent basal portions with the roots, and discard the fibrous blades. From the bamboos, they eat seedlings, culms and lateral shoots. During the dry season from January to April, they mainly browse on both leaves and twigs preferring the fresh foliage, and consume thorn bearing shoots of acacia species without any obvious discomfort. They feed on the bark of white thorn and other flowering plants, and consume the fruits of wood apple, tamarind, kumbhi and date palm.

In Nepal's Bardia National Park, elephants consume large amounts of the floodplain grass, particularly during the monsoon season. They browse more in the dry season with bark constituting a major part of their diet in the cool part of that season. Grasses such as Imperata cylindrica and Leersia hexandra constituted by far the most predominant component of their diet.

The movement and habitat utilisation patterns of an elephant population were studied in southern India during 1981–83 within a  study area. They preferred habitat where water was available and food plants were palatable. During the dry months of January to April, they congregated at high densities of up to five individuals per km2 in river valleys where browse plants had a much higher protein content than the coarse tall grasses on hill slopes. With the onset of rains in May, they dispersed over a wider area at lower densities, largely into the tall grass forests, to feed on the fresh grasses, which then had a high protein value. During the second wet season from September to December, when the tall grasses became fibrous, they moved into lower elevation short grass open forests. The normal movement pattern could be upset during years of adverse environmental conditions. However, the movement pattern of elephants in this region has not basically changed for over a century, as inferred from descriptions recorded during the 19th century.

During three years of survey, their annual home ranges overlapped to a large extent with only minor shifts in the home ranges between years.

Conservation

The pre-eminent threats to Asian elephants today are habitat loss, degradation, and fragmentation, which are driven by an expanding human population, and lead in turn to increasing conflicts between humans and elephants when elephants eat or trample crops. Loss of significant extents of elephant range and suitable habitat continues; their free movement is impeded by reservoirs, hydroelectric projects and associated canals, irrigation dams, numerous pockets of cultivation and plantations, highways, railway lines, mining and industrial development.

Poaching of elephants for ivory is a serious threat in some parts of Asia. Poaching of tuskers impacts on sex ratios that become highly female biased; genetic variation is reduced, and fecundity and recruitment may decline. Poaching has dramatically skewed adult sex ratios in the Periyar Tiger Reserve, where between 1969 and 1989 the adult male:female sex ratio changed from 1:6 to 1:122.

Elephant conservation in northern West Bengal has been set back due to high-levels of human–elephant conflict and elephant mortality owing to railway accidents. The railway track between Siliguri and Alipurduar passes through  of various forest divisions. Every day, 20 trains run on this track at high speeds. Elephants that pass through from one forest patch to another dash against the trains and die. A total of 39 dead elephants were reported during the period of 1958 to 2008, of which ten were reported killed between 2004 and 2008.

In Bangladesh, forested areas that served as prime elephant habitat have undergone drastic reduction, which had a severe impact on the wild elephant population. Habitat loss and fragmentation is attributed to the increasing human population and its need for fuel wood and timber. Illegal timber extraction plays a significant role in deforestation and habitat degradation. As a result of the shrinking habitat, elephants have become more and more prone to coming into direct conflict with humans.

In Myanmar, demand for elephant ivory for making tourist items is higher than ever before. The military government shows little interest in reducing the ivory trade, while the elephants in the country have become the silent victims. After the worldwide ivory ban, prices of raw ivory in the country skyrocketed from $76 a kilo for large tusks in 1989/90 to over $200 a kilo by the mid-1990s. Foreign tourists are responsible for the massive rise in price of ivory tusks which fuels the illegal killing of elephants. There is also a sizeable trade in ivory chopsticks and carvings, smuggled by traders from Myanmar into China.

Young wild-born elephants are removed from their mothers in Myanmar for use in Thailand's tourism industry. Mothers are often killed in the process, and calves are placed alongside unrelated cows to suggest they are with their mothers. The calves are often subjected to a 'breaking in' process, which may involve being tied up, confined, starved, beaten and tortured, as a result of which two-thirds may perish.

Electrocution due to contact with electric poles and transformers has been reported as another major threat to elephants in India, with an estimated 461 elephants having been electrocuted between 2009 and 2017.

For disease risk, see Elephant endotheliotropic herpesvirus.

Project Elephant

Project Elephant was launched in 1992 by the Government of India Ministry of Environment and Forests to provide financial and technical support of wildlife management efforts by states for their free ranging populations of wild Asian Elephants. The project aims to ensure long-term survival of viable conservation reliant populations of elephants in their natural habitats by protecting the elephants, their habitats and migration corridors. Other goals of Project Elephant are supporting research of the ecology and management of elephants, creating conservation awareness among local people, providing improved veterinary care for captive elephants.

Culture
The Indian elephant is a cultural symbol throughout its range in Asia. In Thailand, it is the national animal. In India, it has been designated the national heritage animal (the tiger being the national animal). The Indian elephant is also the state animal of the Indian states of Jharkhand, Karnataka, Kerala and Odisha. It is the national animal of Laos.

See also
 Elephants in Thailand
 Elephants in Kerala culture
 Sri Lankan elephant 
 Sumatran elephant
 Borneo elephant
 Syrian elephant
 Javan elephant
 Mela shikar
 African elephant
 List of individual elephants

References

Further reading 
G. P. Sanderson (1907) Thirteen years among the wild beasts of India: their haunts and habits from personal observation : with an account of the modes of capturing and taming elephants. John Grant, Edinburgh. 8th edition in 2000 by Asian Educational Services, New Delhi. .

External links 

 Animal Diversity Web: Elephas maximus Asiatic elephant
 Honolulu Zoo: Indian Elephant
 Paintings of Indian Elephants

Elephants
Mammals of Bangladesh
Mammals of Bhutan
Mammals of Myanmar
Mammals of Cambodia
Mammals of China
Mammals of India
Mammals of Laos
Mammals of Malaysia
Mammals of Nepal
Mammals of Thailand
Mammals of Vietnam
National symbols of India
National symbols of Thailand
Symbols of Jharkhand
Elephants in India
Taxa named by Georges Cuvier